The Dungeons & Dragons (D&D) fantasy role-playing game has been adapted into many related products, including magazines, films and video games.

Magazines 
In 1975, TSR began publishing The Strategic Review. At the time, role-playing games were still seen as a subgenre of the wargaming industry, and the magazine was designed not only to support D&D and TSR's other games, but also to cover wargaming in general. In short order, however, the popularity and growth of D&D made it clear that the game had not only separated itself from its wargaming origins, but had launched an entirely new industry unto itself. The following year, after only seven issues, TSR cancelled The Strategic Review and replaced it in 1976 with The Dragon (later Dragon Magazine).

Although Dragon Magazine was originally designed to support the role-playing industry in general, it has always been primarily a house organ for TSR's games with a particular focus on D&D. Most of the magazine's articles provide supplementary material for the game, including new races, classes, spells, traps, monsters, skills, and rules. Other articles will provide tips and suggestions for players and DMs. The magazine has also published a number of well-known, gamer-oriented comic strips over the years, including Wormy, SnarfQuest, Yamara, Knights of the Dinner Table, Nodwick, Dork Tower, and The Order of the Stick.

Between 1983 and 1985, TSR's UK branch published Imagine Magazine. It featured similar content to Dragon, focusing on D&D and Advanced Dungeons & Dragons (AD&D). Imagine featured a monthly series of articles about a new campaign world, Pelinore, which were later continued in the non-TSR magazine Game Master. Some material that originated in Imagine was eventually incorporated into Unearthed Arcana.

In 1986, TSR launched a new magazine to complement Dragon. Dungeon Adventures, published bimonthly, published nothing but adventure modules for Dungeon Masters. While Dungeon now publishes other kinds of material as well, Dungeons & Dragons adventures remain its main focus.

While many other magazines have partially or fully devoted themselves to supporting D&D, Dragon and Dungeon remain the only two official publications for the game. In 2002, Wizards of the Coast licensed the two magazines to Paizo Publishing. Publication of both magazines then ceased in September 2007 as the owning company opted for an online model, citing a downturn in the market for low-circulation specialty and hobby magazines. In total, there were 359 Dragon issues and 150 Dungeon issues released in print.  The final 3rd Edition issue of Dragon was #362, and the final 3rd Edition issue of Dungeon was #153. The online version of the magazines are up to issue 408 and 201 respectively as of April 2012.

Films and TV

Animation 
An animated television series, titled Dungeons & Dragons, was produced in 1983. The cartoon was based upon the concept of a small group of young adults and children who get transported to a D&D-based fantasy realm by riding a magical roller coaster. When they arrive, they are given potent magical weapons and must survive against the chromatic dragon Tiamat and a power-hungry nemesis called Venger. They are assisted in each episode by a gnome-like creature called Dungeon Master and a baby unicorn named Uni.

In 2003, a computer animated motion picture entitled Scourge of Worlds: A Dungeons & Dragons Adventure was produced for DVD, featuring the iconic characters (Regdar, Mialee, and Lidda) created for the 3rd Edition. This is an interactive movie that asks viewers to decide what actions the heroes should take at crucial points in the story, allowing hundreds of different story-telling combinations. A special edition was released later that included even more choices, two additional endings, the making of the Scourge of Worlds, and the original (linear) version of film.

The official Dragonlance Chronicles animated movie, Dragonlance: Dragons of Autumn Twilight was released straight to video in January 2008. The film stars the voices of Michael Rosenbaum as Tanis, Kiefer Sutherland as Raistlin, Lucy Lawless as Goldmoon, and Michelle Trachtenberg as Tika.

Live action 

A live action movie, titled Dungeons & Dragons, was released in 2000 to largely negative critical reception. Dungeons & Dragons: Wrath of the Dragon God, a made-for-TV sequel, was first aired on the Sci-Fi Channel on October 8, 2005, receiving better critical reception, and was released on February 7, 2006 on DVD. This sequel is also known by the alternate title Dungeons & Dragons 2: The Elemental Might. A third film was also shot in 2011, Dungeons & Dragons: The Book of Vile Darkness. In 2013, Warner Bros. acquired rights to make a film based on Dungeons & Dragons, using a script written by David Leslie Johnson. However, Hasbro and its subsidiary Wizards of the Coast then sued Sweetpea Entertainment, producer of the first three D&D movies, over its movie deal with Warner claiming that the movie rights (TV and feature) have expired. In 2015, Warner Brothers announced they had reached a settlement with Hasbro's Allspark Pictures and Sweetpea Entertainment over rights and a new movie was in the works.  

As a result of the settlement, Hasbro transferred rights to Paramount Pictures by 2017. Chris McKay was originally brought on in February 2018 to direct the film, but was replaced by Jonathan Goldstein and John Francis Daley in July 2019. In December 2020, Chris Pine was cast to star in the film; then in March 2021, Hugh Grant was cast as the antagonist. Daley announced in August 2021 that filming had been completed; the movie, titled Dungeons & Dragons: Honor Among Thieves, is currently scheduled to be released in March 2023.

In January 2022, Deadline reported that Hasbro's eOne was developing a live action D&D series with Rawson Marshall Thurber writing and directing the pilot. In January 2023, Deadline reported that Paramount+ gave this series an eight-episode, straight-to-series order. It will be co-produced by eOne and Paramount Pictures with Thurber directing the first episode.

Documentary 
In October 2022, Hasbro's eOne announced that it was creating a documentary on Dungeons & Dragons which will be timed to release with the 50th anniversary of the game in 2024. Joe Manganiello and Kyle Newman will co-direct; Manganiello will also produce along with Nick Manganiello, Anthony Savini and Cecily Tyler. Variety reported that "the film will incorporate more than 400 hours of archived, never-before-seen Dungeons & Dragons footage from the game's creation in the early 1970s. It will also include interviews with celebrity fans of the game".

Computer and video games 

Many unique digital games had been released and sold under the D&D license. A significant number of these games were published by Strategic Simulations, Inc. (SSI). Most, but not all, are role-playing video games that use rules derived from some version of the D&D rules. Many of the games were released on multiple platforms, including personal computers, consoles, and handheld devices (including mobile phones).

Novels 

Several hundred novels have been published based upon Dungeons & Dragons.

 Fantasy Grand Master Andre Norton's novel Quag Keep, published in 1979, was set in Greyhawk, making it the first novel to use a D&D campaign setting.
 Throughout the early 1980s, TSR printed several series of gamebooks of varying complexity under series titles such as Endless Quest, Advanced Dungeons & Dragons Adventure Gamebooks, HeartQuest, and 1 on 1 Adventure Gamebooks. Most of these books were based on D&D, although some were based on other TSR role-playing games.
 The Dragonlance product line, begun in 1984, was the first series of novels produced by TSR and has since seen more than 190 titles published.
 D&D creator Gary Gygax's series of Gord the Rogue novels, published from 1985 to 1988, was set in his Greyhawk campaign setting.  A number of other novels have also been set in Greyhawk.
 Numerous novels have been set in the Forgotten Realms campaign setting by such authors as R. A. Salvatore and setting creator Ed Greenwood.
 A number of books have also been published under the generic Dungeons & Dragons heading.  They are as follows:

2nd Edition novels 
 Tale of the Comet (July 1997), by Roland J. Green,
 The Rod of Seven Parts (February 25, 1996), by Douglas Niles,

Dragon Strike 
 The Wizard's Tale (October 1993), by Michael Andrews,
 The Thief's Tale (October 1993), by Michael Andrews,
 The Warrior's Tale (October 1993), by Michael Andrews,
 The Elf's Tale (October 1993), by Michael Andrews

Iconic character 
 The Savage Caves (July 2002), by T. H. Lain,
 The Living Dead (August 2002), by T. H. Lain,
 Oath of Nerull (September 2002), by T. H. Lain,
 City of Fire (November 2002), by  T. H. Lain,
 The Bloody Eye (January 2003), by  T. H. Lain,
 Treachery's Wake (March 2003), by  T. H. Lain,
 Plague of Ice (May 2003), by  T. H. Lain,
 The Sundered Arms (July 2003), by  T. H. Lain,
 Return of the Damned (October 2003), by  T. H. Lain,
 The Death Ray (December 2003), by T. H. Lain,

Knights of the Silver Dragon 
 Secret of the Spiritkeeper (June 2004), by Matt Forbeck,
 Riddle in Stone (August 2004), by Ree Soesbee,
 Sign of the Shapeshifter (October 2004), by Dale Donovan and Linda Johns,
 Eye of Fortune (December 2004), by Denise Graham,
 Figure in the Frost (February 2005), by Lana Perez,
 Dagger of Doom (April 2005), by Kerry Daniel Roberts,
 Hidden Dragon (June 2005), by Lisa Trutkoff Trumbauer,
 The Silver Spell (August 2005), by Anjali Bannerjee,
 Key to the Griffon's Lair (October 2005), by Candice Ransom,
 Curse of the Lost Grove (December 2005), by Denise R. Graham,
 Mystery of the Wizard's Tomb (February 2006), by Rachel Plummer,
 Mark of the Yuan-Ti (April 2006), by Kerry Daniel Roberts,
 Prophecy of the Dragons (June 2006) by Matt Forbeck,
 The Dragons Revealed (August 2006) by Matt Forbeck,

Penhaligon 
 The Tainted Sword (October 1992), by D.J. Heinrich,
 The Dragon's Tomb (October 1992), by D.J. Heinrich,
 The Fall of Magic (October 1993), by D.J. Heinrich,

2010 relaunch 
 The Mark of Nerath (August 2010), by Bill Slavicsek,
 The Seal of Karga Kul (December 2010), by Alex Irvine,
 The Last Garrison (December 2011), by Matthew Beard,

The Abyssal Plague 
 The Temple of the Yellow Skulls (March 2011), by Don Bassingthwaite,
 Oath of Vigilance (August 2011), by James Wyatt,
 The Eye of the Chained God (April 2012), by Don Bassingthwaite,

HarperCollins 
In 2021, HarperCollins Children's Books announced exclusive rights to publish Dungeons & Dragons middle grade books such as "novels, illustrated chapter books, and graphic novels". The first book of the Dungeon Academy series, Dungeon Academy: No Humans Allowed by author Madeleine Roux and artist Tim Probert, is scheduled to be released in Fall 2021 and is set in the Forgotten Realms. The publisher also announced two other series would begin in 2022: an untitled Dungeons & Dragons graphic novel series by author Molly Ostertag and artist Xanthe Bouma and the Dungeons & Dragons: HarperChapters series.

Comics

1985–2010 
During the 1980s and 1990s, DC Comics published several licensed D&D comics, including Advanced Dungeons & Dragons, Dragonlance, Forgotten Realms, and Spelljammer. Also during the 1980s, one-page "mini-comics" appeared as advertisements in both Marvel and DC publications, always ending with the line "To Be Continued..."

After the release of the 3rd Edition, KenzerCo, better known for the popular gaming comic Knights of the Dinner Table, secured the licensing rights to produce official D&D comics. Using the license, they produced a number of different mini-series. One notable mini-series for this comic line entitled Tempest's Gate was authored by Sean Smith. It featured memorable iconic characters of D&D such as Zed Kraken, a powerful and influential magus.

In 2002, Iron Hammer Graphics published the single-issue comic Vecna: Hand of the Revenent. In 2005, the license passed to Devil's Due Productions. Starting in June of that year, Devil's Due began releasing official adaptations of D&D tie-in novels, starting with Salvatore's Dark Elf Trilogy.

As webcomics grew, many D&D inspired comics were created with some of them even going as far as publishing physical books. Amongst the more popular ones are Rich Burlew's The Order of the Stick and Tarol Hunts's Goblins. The game has also been seen in several FoxTrot comic strips over the years played by Jason and his best friend Marcus.

2010–present 

In 2010, IDW Publishing started publishing an ongoing Dungeons & Dragons comic based on the 4th Edition core setting which finished in February 2012. In 2011, they also released a limited series based on the Dark Sun campaign setting, as well as another series, Forgotten Realms: The Legend of Drizzt: Neverwinter Tales, written by R.A. Salvatore and based on his famous D&D character, Drizzt Do'Urden.

Since 2014, IDW Publishing have published several limited series based on the 5th Edition core setting starting with Legends of Baldur's Gate (2014) — Jim Zub "has had a hand in nearly every D&D comic since" this limited series was published. This series has five sequel limited series: Shadows of the Vampire (2016), Frost Giant’s Fury (2017), Evil at Baldur’s Gate (2018), Infernal Tide (2019), and Mindbreaker (2021). Two additional limited series have also been published: A Darkened Wish (2019) and At the Spine of the World (2020). In 2020, author B. Dave Walters was the Dungeon Master for A Darkened Wish, an official actual play web series, which was based on the comic; it ran for 30 episodes and ended in 2021. 

On August 29, 2018, a crossover comic with the adult animated sitcom Rick and Morty was published by IDW and Oni Press. The series titled Rick and Morty vs. Dungeons & Dragons is co-written by Jim Zub and Patrick Rothfuss, and drawn by Troy Little. A four-issue sequel, Rick and Morty vs. Dungeons & Dragons: Chapter II: Painscape, written by Jim Zub and Sarah Stern with art by Troy Little was published in 2019. A five-issue crossover comic with the Netflix television series Stranger Things was published by IDW and Dark Horse Comics on November 4, 2020.

Board games 
Several board games have been sold either under the Dungeons & Dragons trademark or in association with it:

 Dungeon! (1975), a board game published by TSR, featured similar gameplay and genre tropes to D&D and was frequently advertised in D&D products.
 Dungeons & Dragons Computer Labyrinth Game (1980), the first computer/board game hybrid and the first D&D licensed game that contained digital electronics.
 Quest for the Dungeonmaster (1984)
 Dragons of Glory (1986)
 Dragon Lance (1988)
 Mertwig's Maze (1988) by Tom Wham
 The New Dungeon (1989)
 The New Dungeon Miniatures and Game Supplement (1989)
 Magestones (1990)
 Greyhawk Wars (1991)
 The New Easy to Master Dungeons & Dragons (1991) This game is in a way an introduction to role-playing games, but is played as a board game. Three expansions were released for it: Dragon's Den, Haunted Tower, and Goblin's Lair.
 Dragon Quest (1992)
 The Classic Dungeon (1992)
 DragonStrike (1993) used a simplified form of D&D and included an instructional video tape in which costumed actors, combined with computer-generated imagery, played the characters and monsters from the board game.
 First Quest (1994) was the name of the AD&D game that first featured an audio CD which included instructions and two quests that coincide with two of the four adventures in the included Adventure Book.
 Clue Dungeons & Dragons (2001) Standard Clue with a D&D fantasy theme and optional wandering monsters.
 Dungeons & Dragons: The Fantasy Adventure Board Game (2002) Cooperative dungeon crawl game in which a party of four heroes strives to complete adventures that the Dungeon Master puts before them (In the Style of HeroQuest). Two expansions have been released for this game:
 Eternal Winter (2004)
 Forbidden Forest (2005)
 Dungeons & Dragons Basic Game (2004 & 2006) A simplified version of the D&D role-playing game, designed as an introduction to role-playing, but is in essence a board game in the style of presentation.
 Castle Ravenloft Board Game (2010)
 Wrath of Ashardalon (2011)
 Conquest of Nerath (2011)
 The Legend of Drizzt Board Game (2011)
 Lords of Waterdeep (2012) A German-style board game
 Dungeon Command (2012)
 Temple of Elemental Evil (2015)
 Tyrants of the Underdark (2016)
Rock Paper Wizard (2016) A card game where players are competing wizards in a race for loot.
Betrayal at Baldur’s Gate (2017) A D&D themed version of Betrayal at House on the Hill.
Tomb of Annihilation (Adventure System Board Game) (2017)
Assault of the Giants (2017) A game where players command one of six types of giants and compete to claim the right to rule over all giantkind.
Dragonfire (2017) A deckbuilder game.
Dungeon Mayhem (2018) A card game where players are competing to be the last adventurer standing.
Waterdeep: Dungeon of the Mad Mage (2019) Board game, released with standard and premium edition.
Dungeons & Dragons: Adventure Begins (2020) Board game, Gloomhaven style game loosely based on D&D with a bent on telling stories and having no Dungeon Master.

Toys 
 From 1983 to 1984, LJN produced a line of Advanced Dungeons & Dragons action figures.
 The Official Advanced Dungeons & Dragons Coloring Album was published in 1979 by Troubador Press and TSR, written by Gary Gygax and illustrated by Greg Irons. It was both a coloring book and a mini adventure module.

Software 
 Dragonfire II: The Dungeonmaster's Assistant – Designed to assist a dungeon master in managing campaigns.
 AD&D Dungeon Masters Assistant Volume I: Encounters (1988, SSI)
 AD&D Dungeon Masters Assistant Volume II: Characters & Treasures (1989)
 Advanced Dungeons & Dragons CD-ROM Core Rules (1996) — Collection of tools for players
 Core Rules CD-ROM 2.0 (1998) — Collection of tools for players
Core Rules 2.0 EXPANSION (1999) — Updates for Core Rules CD-ROM 2.0
 Dragon Magazine Archive (1999) — Collection of 257 magazines and newsletters
 Forgotten Realms Interactive Atlas (1999) — Collection of editable maps of the Forgotten Realms world Toril
 Dungeons & Dragons Character Builder (2008) — 4th Edition Character Generator released as part of the Dungeons & Dragons Insider initiative. The free version only lets characters of level 3 or less be created.

Soundtrack 
The first official soundtrack to Dungeons & Dragons was produced when Wizards of the Coast teamed up with Midnight Syndicate, producing the 24-track album Dungeons & Dragons. The album was released on August 12, 2003, and received positive reviews from both the gaming and music community.

Web series 

Wizards of the Coast has created, produced and sponsored multiple web series featuring Dungeons & Dragons. These shows have typically aired on the official Dungeons & Dragons Twitch and YouTube channels. Some have been adapted into podcasts. Types of shows include actual play series, event livestreams, and talk shows.

References 

Dungeons & Dragons
Works based on Dungeons & Dragons